George Hartley McQuinn (May 29, 1910 – December 24, 1978) was an American professional baseball player. A seven-time All-Star, he threw and batted left-handed.

Early life
McQuinn was born in Arlington, Virginia, and attended Washington-Lee High School.

Baseball career

During his 12-year MLB playing career, McQuinn played for the Cincinnati Reds (1936), St. Louis Browns (1938–45), Philadelphia Athletics (1946) and New York Yankees (1947–48). He was selected for the American League All-Star team six times (MLB cancelled the 1945 All-Star Game and no All-Stars were named that season).

In 1938, McQuinn had a .324 career-high batting average with 12 home runs, 42 doubles, 100 runs and 82 runs batted in (RBIs). In 1939, his batting average was .316 with 101 runs scored, 94 RBIs, 37 doubles, 13 triples and 20 home runs. The following year he had 39 doubles, 10 triples and 16 home runs. In 1944, his opening-game home run gave the Browns their first victory and was their only home run in a World Series game.

In 1947, at the age of 36, McQuinn hit .304 with 13 home runs and 80 RBIs, and was nominated for the MVP Award. He retired at the end of the 1948 season at the age of 38.

McQuinn had a career batting average of .276, and a total of 135 home runs and 794 RBIs in 1,550 games. He recorded a .992 fielding percentage playing every inning of his major league career at first base. After retiring, he was a manager for the Quebec Braves in the farm system of the Boston/Milwaukee Braves, and scouted for the Washington Senators and Montreal Expos.

He was inducted into the Arlington Sports Hall of Fame in 1958 and the Virginia Sports Hall of Fame in 1978.  He died in Alexandria, Virginia, at the age 68.

See also
 List of Major League Baseball players to hit for the cycle
 Van Lingle Mungo (song)

References

Further reading

External links
, or Retrosheet

1910 births
1978 deaths
Albany Senators players
American League All-Stars
Atlanta Crackers managers
Baseball players from Virginia
Binghamton Triplets players
Cincinnati Reds players
Major League Baseball first basemen
Montreal Expos scouts
New York Yankees players
Newark Bears (IL) players
Philadelphia Athletics players
Quebec Braves players
St. Louis Browns players
Scranton Miners players
Sportspeople from Arlington County, Virginia
Toronto Maple Leafs (International League) players
Washington Senators (1961–1971) scouts
Wheeling Stogies players
Washington-Liberty High School alumni